In mathematics, in the realm of group theory, a class automorphism is an automorphism of a group that sends each element to within its conjugacy class. The class automorphisms form a subgroup of the automorphism group. Some facts:

 Every inner automorphism is a class automorphism.
 Every class automorphism is a family automorphism and a quotientable automorphism.
 Under a quotient map, class automorphisms go to class automorphisms.
 Every class automorphism is an IA automorphism, that is, it acts as identity on the Abelianization.
 Every class automorphism is a center-fixing automorphism, that is, it fixes all points in the center.
 Normal subgroups are characterized as subgroups invariant under class automorphisms.

For infinite groups, an example of a class automorphism that is not inner is the following: take the finitary symmetric group on countably many elements and consider conjugation by an infinitary permutation. This conjugation defines an outer automorphism on the group of finitary permutations. However, for any specific finitary permutation, we can find a finitary permutation whose conjugation has the same effect as this infinitary permutation. This is essentially because the infinitary permutation takes permutations of finite supports to permutations of finite support.

For finite groups, the classical example is a group of order 32 obtained as the semidirect product of the cyclic ring on 8 elements, by its group of units acting via multiplication. Finding a class automorphism in the stability group that is not inner boils down to finding a cocycle for the action that is locally a coboundary but is not a global coboundary.

Group theory
Group automorphisms